Haeder is a surname. Notable people with the name include:

Josh Haeder (born 1980), American politician
Matthias Haeder (born 1989), German footballer

See also
Hader (disambiguation)#People with the surname